Titus-Bunce House is a historic home located at Cold Spring Harbor in Suffolk County, New York. It is a 2-story, three-bay structure with a -story, three-bay side wing.  It was built about 1820, with decorative additional made in the 1850s in the Italianate style.

It was added to the National Register of Historic Places in 1985.

References

Houses on the National Register of Historic Places in New York (state)
Italianate architecture in New York (state)
Houses completed in 1820
Houses in Suffolk County, New York
National Register of Historic Places in Suffolk County, New York